NCIS: Los Angeles is an American television series that premiered on CBS on September 22, 2009. The series is set in Los Angeles, California and follows the stories of the members of the Office of Special Projects, an undercover division of the Naval Criminal Investigative Service (NCIS). The show and its characters were introduced in a two-part episode during the sixth season of the television series NCIS on April 28 and May 5, 2009. NCIS: Los Angeles was renewed for an eleventh season on April 22, 2019, which premiered on September 29, 2019. On May 6, 2020, NCIS: Los Angeles was renewed for a twelfth season, which premiered on November 8, 2020. On April 23, 2021, NCIS: Los Angeles was renewed for a thirteenth season, which premiered on October 10, 2021. On March 31, 2022, NCIS: Los Angeles was renewed for a fourteenth season. On January 20, 2023, it was announced that the fourteenth season would be its last.

Series overview

Episodes

Introductory episodes
NCIS: Los Angeles and its characters were introduced during the sixth-season episodes of NCIS titled "Legend (Part I)" and "Legend (Part II)". These episodes served as a backdoor pilot for the series.

Season 1 (2009–10)

Season 2 (2010–11)

Season 3 (2011–12)

Season 4 (2012–13)

Season 5 (2013–14)

Season 6 (2014–15)

Season 7 (2015–16)

Season 8 (2016–17)

Season 9 (2017–18)

Season 10 (2018–19)

Season 11 (2019–20)

Season 12 (2020–21)

Season 13 (2021–22)

Season 14 (2022–23)

Ratings

Home media

References 

General references

External links 
  at CBS
 

NCIS: Los Angeles
NCIS: Los Angeles